Dimenhydrinate, sold under the brand name Dramamine in the United States or Gravol in Canada, among others, is an over-the-counter drug used to treat motion sickness and nausea. Dimenhydrinate is a theoclate salt composed of diphenhydramine, an ethanolamine derivative, and 8-chlorotheophylline, a chlorinated theophylline derivative, in a 1:1 ratio.

Medical uses

Nausea 
Dimenhydrinate is an over-the-counter (OTC) antihistamine indicated for the prevention and relief of nausea and vomiting from a number of causes, including motion-sickness and post-operative nausea.

Side effects 
Common side effects may include:
Drowsiness
Dry mouth, nose, or throat
Constipation
Blurred vision
Feeling restless or excited (especially in children)

Continuous and/or cumulative use of anticholinergic medications, including first-generation antihistamines, is associated with higher risk of cognitive decline and dementia in older people.

Pharmacology 
Diphenhydramine is the primary constituent of dimenhydrinate and dictates the primary effect. The main difference relative to pure diphenhydramine is a lower potency due to being combined with 8-chlorotheophylline. By weight, dimenhydrinate is between 53% to 55.5% diphenhydramine. Diphenhydramine is an H1 receptor antagonist that demonstrates anticholinergic activity. 8-Chlorotheophylline is a mild stimulant with a mechanism of action similar to caffeine which is used to offset the sedative effects of diphenhydramine.

Pharmacokinetics 
The diphenhydramine component requires about 2 hours to reach peak concentration after either oral or sublingual administration of diphenhydrinate and has a half-life of 5 - 6 hours in healthy adults.

Recreational use
Dimenhydrinate is recreationally used as a deliriant. Slang terms for Dramamine used this way include "drama", "dime", "dime tabs", "D-Q", "substance D", "d-house", and "drams". Abusing Dramamine is sometimes referred to as Dramatizing or "going a dime a dozen", a reference to the amount of Dramamine tablets generally necessary for a trip.

Many users report a side-effect profile consistent with tropane alkaloid (e.g. atropine) poisoning as both show antagonism of muscarinic acetylcholine receptors in both the central and autonomic nervous system, which inhibits various signal transduction pathways.

Other CNS effects occur within the limbic system and hippocampus, causing confusion and temporary amnesia due to decreased acetylcholine signaling. Toxicology also manifests in the autonomic nervous system, primarily at the neuromuscular junction, resulting in ataxia and extrapyramidal side effects and the feeling of heaviness in the legs, and at sympathetic post-ganglionic junctions, causing urinary retention, pupil dilation, tachycardia, irregular urination, and dry red skin caused by decreased exocrine gland secretions, and mucous membranes. Considerable overdosage can lead to myocardial infarction (heart attack), serious ventricular arrhythmias, coma, and death. Such a side effect profile is thought to give ethanolamine-class antihistamines a relatively low abuse liability. An antidote that can be used for dimenhydrinate poisoning is physostigmine.

Brand names
Dimenhydrinate is marketed under many brand names: in the U.S., Mexico, Turkey, Serbia, and Thailand as Dramamine; in Ukraine as Driminate; in Canada, Costa Rica, and India as Gravol; in Iceland as Gravamin; in Russia and Croatia as Dramina; in South Africa and Germany as Vomex; in Australia and Austria as Vertirosan; in Brazil as Dramin; in Colombia as Mareol; in Ecuador as Anautin; in Hungary as Daedalon; in Indonesia as Antimo; in Italy as Xamamina or Valontan; in Peru as Gravicoll; in Poland and Slovakia as Aviomarin; in Portugal as Viabom, Vomidrine, and Enjomin; in Spain as Biodramina; in Israel as Travamin; and in Pakistan as Gravinate.

Popular culture
Modest Mouse produced a song titled "Dramamine" on their 1996 debut album This Is a Long Drive for Someone with Nothing to Think About. The song uses side effects of the drug as a metaphor for the deteriorating state of a personal relationship.

In Columbo season 4 episode 4 "Troubled Waters", Columbo, suffering sea sickness, is given Dramamine by the nurse and later reports it "saved his life".

References

External links 
 
 
 

Combination drugs
Muscarinic antagonists
H1 receptor antagonists
Deliriants
Antiemetics
Motion sickness